Nathon Burns (born 22 June 1989) is an Irish judoka.
Burns is based at Camberley Judo Club in Surrey; he was previously at Yamakwai in Belfast. A third dan black belt, he describes seoi nage as his favourite technique.

Burns represented Ireland at the 2019 European Games, reaching the last eight in the 66 kg event. He won a bronze medal at the 2022 Commonwealth Games, competing for Northern Ireland in the 66 kg category.

References

External links
 
 
 

Living people
1989 births
Male judoka from Northern Ireland
Irish male judoka
Commonwealth Games medallists in judo
Commonwealth Games bronze medallists for Northern Ireland
Boxers from Belfast
Male boxers from Northern Ireland
Irish male boxers
Judoka at the 2022 Commonwealth Games
Place of birth missing (living people)
21st-century Irish people
Medallists at the 2022 Commonwealth Games